The 1975 Wyoming Cowboys football team was an American football team that represented the University of Wyoming as a member of the Western Athletic Conference (WAC) during the 1975 NCAA Division I football season. In their first year under head coach Fred Akers, the Cowboys compiled a 2–9 record (1–6 against WAC opponents), finished in eighth place, and were outscored by a total of 219 to 174.  The team played its home games on campus at War Memorial Stadium in Laramie, Wyoming. 

Akers was previously the offensive coordinator at the University of Texas under head coach Darrell Royal.

Schedule

Roster

References

Wyoming
Wyoming Cowboys football seasons
Wyoming Cowboys football